Stenerianthus annamensis is a species of grasshopper in the monotypic genus Stenerianthus. It is in the family Chorotypidae, subfamily Erianthinae. This "monkey grasshopper" was discovered in central Vietnam, with the type locality identified as "Lien Chien" near Da Nang.

References

Chorotypidae
Caelifera genera
Monotypic Orthoptera genera
Orthoptera of Vietnam